Connor Joel Franta (born September 12, 1992) is an American YouTuber, author, artist, and businessman.

, his eponymous main channel on YouTube has over 4.91 million subscribers. Franta was formerly a member of YouTube group Our Second Life (stylized Our2ndLife and O2L) under the Fullscreen Network, but is now an independent member of the Big Frame network, managed by Andrew Graham.

Franta has recently become involved in various entrepreneurial enterprises, including a clothing line, music curation, as well as a coffee and lifestyle brand named Common Culture. His debut book, a memoir titled A Work in Progress, was released on April 21, 2015. In July 2015, details of Heard Well, a record label Franta co-founded, were announced.

Early life and education
Connor Joel Franta was born in Wisconsin, the third of four children born to Peter and Cheryl Franta, a physician and homemaker, respectively. He was raised in La Crescent, Minnesota, in a Roman Catholic upbringing.

Franta attended St. Peter's Catholic School in Hokah, Minnesota, from elementary school through 8th grade. As a child, he was overweight, leading his mother to sign him up for a YMCA swimming team. He ran cross country while attending La Crescent High School, where he graduated in 2011. He studied business at the Roman Catholic College of Saint Benedict and Saint John's University (Collegeville, Minnesota). In his sophomore year, he added an arts minor, with an emphasis on films. He subsequently dropped out of college and moved to Los Angeles in 2013 to pursue his YouTube career.

Career

YouTube

Inspired by other YouTube vloggers such as Mitchell Davis, Franta uploaded his first video to YouTube in August 2010. He has more than 400 million views on his channel and over 4.9 million subscribers.

In 2012, he joined a collaboration channel known as "Our2ndLife" (or O2L for short) along with 5 other YouTube personalities (Kian Lawley, Trevi Moran, JC Caylen, Ricky Dillon and Sam Pottorff) which helped him gain popularity. He announced his departure from the group in July 2014 due to personal issues.

In 2014, Franta was nominated for a Teen Choice Award in the "Web Star: Male" category, but lost to Tyler Oakley. He has made cameo appearances in the 2014 and 2015 YouTube Rewind videos, a tribute by YouTube to the year's most popular videos on the website.

In 2015, Franta was again nominated for a Teen Choice Award in the "Entertainer of the Year" category and in the "Choice YouTuber" category, but lost to Cameron Dallas and Bethany Mota respectively. He also was nominated for a Streamy Award in the "Audience Choice Entertainer of the Year" category. In October 2015, Franta appeared as a featured celebrity at StreamCon which took place in New York City.

In January 2016, Franta won the "Favorite YouTube Star" award at the 42nd People's Choice Awards. In October, Franta appeared at the "We Day" Conference in Toronto, Canada.

Other projects

The Thirst Project
Franta celebrated his 22nd birthday in 2014 by launching a fundraising campaign for The Thirst Project to build water wells for people in Swaziland. He set a goal of raising of $120,000 within a month by offering fans incentives such as T-shirts, posters, an acknowledgement in one of his videos and a Skype call with him. Within 48 hours, fans raised over US$75,000 and met the original $120,000 goal in 10 days. By the end the month, the campaign raised over $230,000. He later visited Swaziland to see the wells the donations helped build. Franta received the Governor's Award for his work at the Thirst Project's 6th Annual Thirst Gala on June 30, 2015.

Franta launched a second campaign for his 23rd birthday with the goal of raising $180,000 in 30 days. When the campaign closed in October 2015, he had raised more than $191,000 dollars, which contributed to the building of 16 water wells in Swaziland.

Entrepreneurship
On November 11, 2014, Franta released a compilation album, Crown, Vol. 1, of songs from his choice of up-and-coming musicians. The album charted on the Billboard 200. A second compilation was released under Franta's Common Culture brand on March 3, 2015, followed by a third compilation on July 24, 2015, a fourth on December 25, 2015, and a fifth on April 28, 2016.

In July 2015, it was announced that Franta had started a record label, Heard Well, in partnership with his manager Andrew Graham and Jeremy Wineberg of music distribution and licensing company Opus Label (through which Franta's first two compilations were released). Variety described Heard Well as "a music label focused on producing compilation albums featuring undiscovered artists as curated by digital 'influencers.'" Amanda Steele, Anthony Quintal (Lohanthony), and Jc Caylen are the first digital stars signed to put together compilations.

In February 2015, Franta released his own line of coffee, called Common Culture Coffee. The coffee was produced in collaboration with LA Coffee Club and $1 from each bag of coffee sold was donated to The Thirst Project.

In June 2015, Franta released a small limited edition line of clothing, made in collaboration with Junk Food Clothing. In January 2016, Franta launched his new website for Common Culture.

Writing
Franta spent over a year writing his memoir, A Work in Progress, which talks about moments from his life since birth and personal stories. It was released on April 21, 2015. Accompanying the release of the book, Franta had a book tour in the United States with appearances in Minnesota, Houston, Orlando, New York City, New Jersey, and Los Angeles, London, Birmingham, Manchester, Liverpool and Leeds in the United Kingdom, and Sydney, Melbourne, Brisbane and Perth in Australia. The book spent 16 weeks on The New York Times Best Seller list and sold over 200,000 copies.

In January 2017, Franta announced he would be releasing his second book, Note to Self, on April 18, 2017. The book features essays, stories, poetry and photography by Franta about issues including clinical depression, social anxiety, breakups, and self-love. Franta said "If my first book, A Work in Progress, was a reflection of my external life so far, then this follow-up is a reflection of my internal life."

In June 2021, Franta announced his third memoir, House Fires, was set to be released on September 21, 2021.

Photography
Franta's photography has been published in V Magazine, L'Officiel Magazine, and Paper Magazine. He has photographed many celebrities including Jonathan Van Ness, Billie Eilish, Doja Cat, Olivia Rodrigo, Hailee Steinfeld, Maude Apatow, Chloe x Halle, Conan Gray, Tinashe, and HAIM.

Personal life 
On December 8, 2014, Franta publicly came out as gay in a YouTube video, stating he has accepted who he is and is "happy with that person". He also spoke on the help he got from others on the Internet, and wanted to give people struggling with their sexuality similar advice. This six-minute long video, titled "Coming Out", has over 12 million views and over 976,000 likes, being the second most viewed video on Franta's channel as of February 20, 2022.

Franta currently resides in West Hollywood, California.

Bibliography
 A Work in Progress (2015)
 Note to Self (2017)
 House Fires (2021)

References

External links

 
 

1992 births
21st-century American businesspeople
21st-century American male writers
21st-century American memoirists
American YouTubers
Businesspeople from Minnesota
Catholics from Minnesota
Catholics from Wisconsin
College of Saint Benedict and Saint John's University alumni
Gay entertainers
American gay writers
American LGBT businesspeople
American LGBT entertainers
Gay memoirists
LGBT people from Minnesota
LGBT people from Wisconsin
LGBT YouTubers
Lifestyle YouTubers
Living people
Twitch (service) streamers
People from La Crescent, Minnesota
20th-century LGBT people
21st-century LGBT people